Compression therapy may refer to:

Attachment therapy, a loosely identified category of mental health interventions.
Cold compression therapy, to reduce pain and swelling from a sports or activity injury.